The Governor of Togdheer is the chief executive of the Somaliland region of Togdheer, leading the region's executive branch. Governors of the regions is appointed to the office by the Somaliland president. The current governor of Togdheer is Mahamed Abdillaahi Ibraahim Hujaale.

See also

Togdheer
Politics of Somaliland

References

External links

Togdheer
Governors of Somaliland
Governors of Togdheer